Coleman Alexander Collins (born July 22, 1986) is a retired American professional basketball player who last played for BCM Gravelines of the LNB Pro A.

Early life
Collins attended Chamblee High School in Chamblee, Georgia, where he played basketball and ran track. He was selected to the all-Atlanta Metro team as a senior, and was MVP of the Florida-Georgia All-Star Game. He also placed 3rd in the state finals in the 400m. He went on to play college basketball at Virginia Tech, where he scored 1144 points, averaging 10.5 points and 5.6 rebounds for his career.

Professional career
Collins went undrafted in the 2007 NBA draft. In August 2007, he signed with EnBW Ludwigsburg in Germany. In May 2008, he left the team. He went on to sign a contract with the Phoenix Suns. After participating in training camp, he was released before the regular season began. He spent the 2008–09 season with the Fort Wayne Mad Ants of the NBDL. In July 2009, he signed with ratiopharm Ulm. He stayed with the German team for two seasons, leaving in May 2011.

In September 2011, he signed with HKK Široki in Bosnia. In the spring of 2012, he won both the Bosnian Cup and the league championship.

In July 2012, he signed a two-year contract with Chorale Roanne in France. In a breakout year, he averaged 10.6 points and 7 rebounds during the regular season, and increased his production by averaging 18.3 points and 7 rebounds in the playoffs. In June 2013, he activated a release clause in his contract and left the team, paying the buyout himself.

In July 2013, he signed a one-year deal with Azovmash of Ukraine. Following the events of the 2014 Ukrainian Revolution, amid the onset of the War in Donbass, he left Azovmash on March 1, 2014. Three days later, he signed with Manama Club of Bahrain. In May 2014, he won the Bahrani Championship.

On July 22, 2014, he signed a two-year deal with BCM Gravelines of the French LNB Pro A. On October 21, 2015, he parted ways with Gravelines after averaging 4.7 points and 2.7 rebounds per game.

Personal life
Collins is also a freelance writer and artist.  While at Virginia Tech he wrote a column for the student newspaper, The Collegiate Times. His writing has been published in various venues, including BOMB Magazine,  ESPN.com, and the Huffington Post. Collins received a Master of Fine Arts from UCLA. In 2021, he showed artworks in museum exhibitions at the Kunsthalle Wien and the Carré d'Art, Nîmes.

He speaks several languages, including German, French and Spanish.

References

External links
 Eurobasket.com profile
 FIBA.com profile
 Collins' 2012-2013 Highlights
 Collins' 2013-2014 Highlights

1986 births
Living people
African-American basketball players
American expatriate basketball people in Bosnia and Herzegovina
American expatriate basketball people in France
American expatriate basketball people in Germany
American expatriate basketball people in Ukraine
American men's basketball players
Basketball players from Georgia (U.S. state)
Basketball players from New Jersey
BC Azovmash players
BCM Gravelines players
Centers (basketball)
Chorale Roanne Basket players
Fort Wayne Mad Ants players
HKK Široki players
Riesen Ludwigsburg players
People from Chamblee, Georgia
People from Princeton, New Jersey
Power forwards (basketball)
Ratiopharm Ulm players
Sportspeople from DeKalb County, Georgia
Sportspeople from Mercer County, New Jersey
Virginia Tech Hokies men's basketball players
21st-century African-American sportspeople
20th-century African-American people